Bearing modulus is a modulus used in journal bearing design.  It is a dimensionless number.

Formula
Bearing Modulus (C) is C = (Zn/p) where
 Z = oil viscosity
 n = speed of rotation (rpm)
 p = bearing pressure(N/MM2)

For any given bearing, there is a value for indicated by C, for which the coefficient of friction is at a minimum. The bearing should not be operated at this value of bearing modulus, since a slight decrease in speed or a slight increase in pressure will make the part of a shaft or axle that rests on bearings operate in partial lubrication state resulting in high friction, heating and wear.

To prevent this, the average value of Bearing modulus should be
 Zn/p >= 3C
or for large fluctuations and heavy impact loads
 Zn/p = 15C (approx)

References

Bearings (mechanical)